Mormon Doctrine (originally subtitled A Compendium of the Gospel) is an encyclopedic work written in 1958 by Bruce R. McConkie, a general authority of the Church of Jesus Christ of Latter-day Saints (LDS Church). It was intended primarily for a Latter-day Saint audience and has been used as a reference book by church members because of its comprehensive nature, and was a highly influential all-time bestseller in the LDS community. It was viewed by many members both then and now as representing official doctrine despite never being endorsed by the church. It has been both heavily criticized by some church leaders and members and well regarded by others. After the book's first edition was removed from publication at the instruction of the church's First Presidency and Quorum of the Twelve, corrections were made in subsequent editions. The book went through three editions but has been out of print since 2010.

History
In 1958, McConkie, then a member of the First Council of the Seventy of the LDS Church, published a book entitled Mormon Doctrine: A Compendium of the Gospel, which he described as "the first major attempt to digest, explain, and analyze all of the important doctrines of the kingdom" and "the first extensive compendium of the whole gospel—the first attempt to publish an encyclopedic commentary covering the whole field of revealed religion." He included a disclaimer that he alone was responsible for the doctrinal and scriptural interpretations, a practice then unusual.

In writing the book, McConkie relied heavily upon the LDS Church's scriptures and recognized doctrinal authorities, including Joseph Smith, Brigham Young, Orson Pratt, John Taylor, and Joseph Fielding Smith.

Scrutiny by church leaders
Church leaders were surprised by its publication since he had not asked permission and was not asked to develop such a work. They responded that while they applauded the attempt of the book to fill a need, it used a harsh tone. Apostle Mark E. Petersen said it was "full of errors and misstatements, and it is most unfortunate that it has received such wide circulation."

On January 5, 1959, apostle Marion G. Romney was assigned by church president David O. McKay to read and report on the book. His report was delivered on January 28, which mainly "dealt with Elder McConkie's usage of forceful, blunt language; some strongly worded statements about ambiguous doctrine and matters of opinion; and the overall authoritative tone throughout the book, though in general Romney had a high regard for Mormon Doctrine and felt it filled an evident need remarkably well." The report concluded that "notwithstanding its many commendable and valuable features and the author's assumption of 'sole and full responsibility' for it, its nature and scope and the authoritative tone of the style in which it is written pose the question as to the propriety of the author's attempting such a project without assignment and supervision from him whose right and responsibility it is to speak for the church on 'Mormon Doctrine.'"

Petersen "gave McKay an oral report in which he recommended 1,067 corrections" to the book.

Publication restriction
Nearly a year later, after meeting to discuss the book, the January 8, 1960 office notes of McKay reflect:

McKay called Joseph Fielding Smith on January 27, 1960, to inform him of the decision to ban further publication of the book:

When the First Presidency met with McConkie about their decision, he responded, "I am amenable to whatever you Brethren want. I will do exactly what you want. I will be as discreet and as wise as I can."

Second edition
In his biography of his father, Joseph Fielding McConkie states:

Other accounts of the meeting suggest that McConkie sought out permission and generously interpreted McKay's counsel:

Three days after meeting with McKay, McConkie wrote in a memo to Clare Middlemiss, McKay's secretary, "President McKay indicated that the book should be republished at this time."

Another account was given in an audio interview of Oscar W. McConkie Jr. on June 26, 2017:

Changes between the first and second editions

The second edition of Mormon Doctrine, with its approved revisions, was published in 1966. Horne states, "The most obvious difference between the two editions is a more moderate tone." Many entries were removed, while others were added, and entire paragraphs were changed in other entries. Complete removals included entire entries which specifically labeled the Roman Catholic church as the Church of the Devil and the great and abominable church, including the sections titled "Catholicism" and "Roman Catholicism". Other removed sections were critical of aspects unique to Catholicism including the sections "Indulgences", "Supererogation", and "Transubstantiation".

Other notable changes in the second edition also include the removal of sentences stating that

 "Suicide is murder, pure and simple, and murderers are damned", 
 "No doubt psychiatry ... has some benefit ... but in many instances, it is in effect a form of apostate religion which keeps sinners from repenting....", and 
 that all those using condoms or other artificial contraception are "in rebellion against God and are guilty of gross wickedness."

Additionally removed were references to evolution, including

 one stating that the "official doctrine of the Church" asserted a "falsity of the theory of organic evolution", along with sentences stating  
 that "There were no pre-Adamites", 
 that Adam was not the "end-product of evolution", and 
 that there "was no death in the world, either for man or for any form of life until after the Fall of Adam."

In later printings of the second edition, changes were made to doctrinal statements regarding black people in the pre-mortal life. The 1969 printing retained the controversial statements, but printings of the second edition by 1978 reflected the new church policy.

Third edition
A third edition of the book was published in 1978 after church president Spencer W. Kimball said he received a revelation that the priesthood should be extended to all worthy male members. The changes were also included in the last printings of the second edition.

In the 1966 edition of Mormon Doctrine, McConkie wrote that those who were sent to Earth through the lineage of Cain were those who had been less valiant in the premortal life. He also said that because Ham married Egyptus and because she was a descendant of Cain, that he was able to preserve the "negro lineage." The denial of the priesthood to certain men was then mentioned and he explained that in this life, black people would not hold the priesthood, but that those blessings would be available to them in the next life. In 1881, church president John Taylor expounded on the belief that the curse placed on Ham (who was of the lineage of Cain), was continued because Ham's wife was also of that "seed."" In 1978, McConkie said the curse of Cain was no longer in effect. McConkie's theology concerning people of African descent and the Mormon priesthood was removed from the third edition.

Legacy
While the Bible Dictionary included with the LDS Church's publication of the Bible in 1979 is based upon the Cambridge University Press bible dictionary, modifications were made to many entries to better reflect Mormon beliefs, and McConkie's ideas as found in Mormon Doctrine heavily influenced those changes. For example, the entry for "Abraham, covenant of" in the Bible Dictionary is exactly the same as the entry for "Abrahamic covenant" in Mormon Doctrine except for one paragraph. Many other Bible Dictionary entries teach identical concepts with closely paralleled wording as corresponding entries in Mormon Doctrine.

In 1972, McConkie was called to serve in the Quorum of Twelve Apostles by church president Harold B. Lee.

End of printing
Deseret Book opted in 2010 to cease printing the book, stating it was because of low sales. Despite Deseret Book's citing low sales, a story published the day before on KUTV stated that local Salt Lake City booksellers reported consistently strong sales of the book.

See also

Black people and Mormonism
Mormon folklore
Mormonism and evolution

References

External links
 "A Requiem for Bruce R. McConkie’s Mormon Doctrine" : A discussion of Mormon Doctrine on Mormon Expression

1958 non-fiction books
1966 non-fiction books
LDS non-fiction
Mormonism-related controversies
Deseret Book books
1958 in Christianity
Bookcraft books
Works by general authorities (LDS Church)
Anti-Catholicism in the United States
Anti-psychiatry books
Anti-black racism in the United States
Creationist publications